NGC 3223 is a faint spiral galaxy in the constellation Antlia. It was discovered on February 2, 1835 by the English astronomer John Herschel. The galaxy lies at a distance of approximately 110 million light years away and is receding with a heliocentric radial velocity of 2,896 km/s. The morphological class of NGC 3223 is SA(s)b, indicating it is a spiral with no central bar (SA), no inner ring feature, and moderately tightly wound spiral arms. The galactic plane is inclined at an angle of 46° to the line of sight from the Earth, with the major axis along a position angle of 128°. It has at least two well-defined arms and is flocculent in appearance.

References

External links

Antlia
Unbarred spiral galaxies
3223
18350202
030308